Camille Piché  (April 27, 1865 – April 6, 1909) was a Canadian lawyer and politician.

Born in St-Gabriel-de-Brandon, Canada East, the son of P. C. Piche, a notary and Sophie Desparois dite Champagne, Piché was educated at the Jacques Cartier Normal School and at Laval University where he received a Bachelor of Laws degree. A member of the Quebec Bar, he practiced as a lawyer in Montreal with his firm Piche & Mercier. He was made a King's Counsel by the Quebec Government in 1904. He was elected to the House of Commons of Canada for the electoral district of St. Mary in the 1904 federal election. When a liberal appointed a Police Magistrate in Montreal, Piché was resigned in 1906.

References
 The Canadian Parliament; biographical sketches and photo-engravures of the senators and members of the House of Commons of Canada. Being the tenth Parliament, elected November 3, 1904
 

1865 births
1909 deaths
Liberal Party of Canada MPs
Members of the House of Commons of Canada from Quebec
Lawyers in Quebec
Service de police de la Ville de Montréal
Canadian King's Counsel